Thrombidae is a family of sea sponges.

Genera
Thrombus Sollas, 1886
Yucatania Gómez, 2006

References

Tetractinellida